Pudsey The Dog: The Movie is a 2014 British 3D live action family comedy film directed by Nick Moore, produced by Simon Cowell, written by Paul Rose with music by Simon Woodgate and starring Pudsey the Dog, one half of the dancing duo Ashleigh and Pudsey, voiced by David Walliams.

Other stars include Jessica Hynes, John Sessions, Jim Tavaré and Izzy Meikle-Small. The film was made by Vertigo Films and Syco Entertainment, and was released in the United Kingdom on 18 July 2014, after it was originally set to be released in December the previous year. The film received negative reviews from critics, and it earned £2.6 million on a £2.5 million budget.

On 10 November 2014, Pudsey the Dog: The Movie was released on DVD in the United Kingdom.

Cast
David Walliams as Pudsey (voice)
John Sessions as Thorne
Jessica Hynes as Gail
Izzy Meikle-Small as Molly
Malachy Knights as Tommy
Luke Neal as Farmer Jack
Luke Tittensor as Will
Lorraine Kelly as Cat (voice)
Dan Farrell as Ken and Finn
Jim Tavare as The Dog Catcher
Peter Serafinowicz as Edward the Horse (voice)
Olivia Colman as Nelly the Horse (voice)
Ashleigh Butler as Anabella The Cow (voice)

Production
In January 2013, it was announced that Simon Cowell would produce Pudsey The Dog: The Movie. The film, which was released on 18 July 2014, follows Pudsey and his siblings Molly, George, and Tommy as they move to the village of Chuffington-on-Sea with their mother Gail (Jessica Hynes) and set out to save the village, from their landlord Mr Thorne (John Sessions) and his cat Faustus. Pudsey is voiced by comedian David Walliams.

Soundtrack
 Pudsey: He's Got The Love – Performed by Echobass
 Things Are Getting Better – Performed by Echobass
 Breaking It Down – Performed by Echobass
 Tea Dance – Composed by Norman Warren
 All Music – Composed by Simon Woodgate

Home media
On 10 November 2014, Pudsey the Dog: The Movie was released on DVD in the United Kingdom.

Critical reception and box office 
In its first week, the film grossed £446,000, finishing outside of a Top 5 led by Dawn of the Planet of the Apes with £8.7 million. This was described by the BBC as a "flop". Pudsey: The Movie was critically panned. On review aggregator website Rotten Tomatoes it holds a rare 0% approval rating with an average score of 3.3/10 based on 14 reviews.

Peter Bradshaw of The Guardian called the film "so depressingly bad that cinemas should play the adagietto from Mahler's Fifth over a loudspeaker as audiences file out grimly into the foyer afterwards, silently asking themselves if life has any value... Watching this movie, I was overwhelmed with three emotions: boredom, embarrassment and chiefly shame on behalf of everyone involved, shame that something so shoddily made and mediocre could ever have emerged from our film industry."

Writing in The Observer, Mark Kermode said "nothing can explain (or excuse) the sheer skull scraping ugliness of this relentlessly tacky Britain's Got Talent spin off... If you paid to see this, you would feel duty bound to demand your money back; I saw it for free and still wanted a refund." David Edwards of the Daily Mirror called the film a "cheap and cheerless embarrassment" with a "thin and familiar" plot and said it "deserves to be scraped from the lawn, and dropped in the bin."

References

External links

2014 films
2014 comedy films
Films based on television series
Films about dogs
British comedy films
Vertigo Films films
Britain's Got Talent
Films produced by Simon Cowell
Films directed by Nick Moore
2010s English-language films
2010s British films